The 22nd Dáil was elected at the 1981 general election on 11 June 1981 and met on 30 June 1981. The members of Dáil Éireann, the house of representatives of the Oireachtas (legislature), of Ireland are known as TDs. On 27 January 1982, President Patrick Hillery dissolved the Dáil at the request of the Taoiseach Garret FitzGerald. The 22nd Dáil is the second shortest Dáil in history, lasting  days. There were no by-elections during the 22nd Dáil.

Composition of the 22nd Dáil

Fine Gael and the Labour Party, denoted with bullets, formed the 17th Government of Ireland.

Graphical representation
This is a graphical comparison of party strengths in the 22nd Dáil from June 1981. This was not the official seating plan.

Ceann Comhairle
On the meeting of the Dáil, John O'Connell (Ind) was proposed by Peter Barry (FG) and seconded by James Tully (Lab) for the position of Ceann Comhairle. He was elected without a vote.

TDs by constituency
The list of the 166 TDs elected is given in alphabetical order by Dáil constituency.

Changes 

On 21 October 1981, a motion to move the writ for the vacancy in Cavan–Monaghan was rejected on a vote of 78 to 80. On 26 January 1982, a second motion in the same terms was defeated on a vote of 78 to 81. The Dáil was dissolved on the following day.

See also
Members of the 15th Seanad

References

External links
Houses of the Oireachtas: Debates: 22nd Dáil

 
22nd Dáil
22